Lorenzo Del Pinto (born 17 June 1990) is an Italian footballer who plays for  club Potenza.

Club career
On 14 January 2021, he signed a 1.5-year contract with Serie B side Reggiana.

References

External links 
 

1990 births
People from L'Aquila
Sportspeople from the Province of L'Aquila
Footballers from Abruzzo
Living people
Italian footballers
Delfino Pescara 1936 players
Alma Juventus Fano 1906 players
S.S. Chieti Calcio players
L'Aquila Calcio 1927 players
Benevento Calcio players
A.C. Reggiana 1919 players
Potenza Calcio players
Serie A players
Serie B players
Serie C players
Serie D players
Association football defenders